Alphonse Roubichou (1861 – 1938) was a French painter. His work was part of the painting event in the art competition at the 1928 Summer Olympics.

References

External links
 

1861 births
1938 deaths
20th-century French painters
20th-century French male artists
French male painters
Olympic competitors in art competitions
People from Pamiers